Pala Kastali is a village in Block Jawan Sikandarpur, Aligarh district of Uttar Pradesh, India. It is 5 km from Aligarh. The village has most population of Bais Rajput. Pala Kastali's Pin Code is 202122. Nearest railway station is Manzurgarhi and nearest Airport is Agra Airport. School near the village is Blackdale public school.

References

Villages in Aligarh district